The Cherokee IOOF Lodge No. 219 is an Odd Fellows building in Cherokee, Oklahoma that was built in 1931.  It has served historically as a clubhouse, as a restaurant, as a mortuary, and as a business.  It was listed in the National Register of Historic Places in 1984.

It is one of four historic, surviving Odd Fellows buildings in Alfalfa County that were subject of a 1983 study.  The others are the Aline IOOF Lodge No. 263 in Aline and the 
Carmen IOOF Home and Carmen IOOF Lodge No. 84 in Carmen.

References

Clubhouses on the National Register of Historic Places in Oklahoma
Buildings and structures in Alfalfa County, Oklahoma
Odd Fellows buildings in Oklahoma
Buildings and structures completed in 1931
National Register of Historic Places in Alfalfa County, Oklahoma